Kal is a village west of Pivka in the Inner Carniola region of Slovenia.

Geography
The territory of the settlement reaches its highest elevation in the north, between the small Prevale Valley and the western slope of Kaludernik Hill.

Church

The local church in the settlement is dedicated to Saint Bartholomew and belongs to the Parish of Košana.

References

External links

Kal on Geopedia

Populated places in the Municipality of Pivka